Mongupethanpatty is a small village, located near Eriyodu in Vedasandur taluk, Dindigul District, Tamil Nadu, India.

Geography 
Mongupethanpatty is located at 10°31′59″N 78°04′01″E / 10.533°N 78.067°E / 10.533; 78.067. It has an average elevation of 260 meters (853 feet).

The nearest airport is at Madurai and the nearest railway station is Dindigul Junction Railway Station. The nearby tourist destinations are Kodaikanal, Sirumalai, Palani.

History 
This village was under Nayak rulers during 17th century and in the mid of 18th century, Hyder Ali, took over. This village was carved out of Madurai District in the year 1985 and attached to newly formed Dindigul district.

People 
This small village has 150 families in it and around 400 voters. Agriculture was the main occupation during 90s. But after the year 2K, that trend has been gradually reduced due to heavy drought.

Some people of this village were started moving to the other cities/states like Tirupur, Coimbatore, Hyderabad & Kerala for earning. They use to come to this village during Pongal, Diwali, Summer (May month – Cricket Festival) & for some functions like Marriage.

Mahathma People Welfare Association 

On 14 January 2010 (தை மாதம் முதல் நாள்), the Youth and Adolescent of this village were stated a club called Mahatma People Welfare Association. The main motto of this club is My village! My Pride!!.

This club includes the youth and adolescent of this village. Some of them are Students, Professionals, Entrepreneurs and Labours. They all together here for their Village Development.

They use to meet all weekends and discuss about their action plans.

Politics

Village Panchayat 
This village comes under ward number 1 in the Village Panchayat Chitthur, Vedasandur Block, Dindigul District. And the elected candidates are,

Legislative Assembly 
This village comes under Vedasandur legislative assembly in Dindigul District and the elected candidate is Dr.V.P.B.Paramasivam

Lok sabha Constituency 
This village comes under Karur lok sabha constituency and the elected candidate is Mr. M.Thambidurai

Nearest towns

External links 
 Nehru Yuva Kendra Sangathan
 Model Village India
 Asha for Education
 Gandhigram Trust

Villages in Dindigul district